The Roman Catholic Diocese of Tocantinópolis is a diocese located in the city of Tocantinópolis in the Ecclesiastical province of Palmas in Brazil.

History
 20 December 1954: Established as Territorial Prelature of Tocantinópolis from the Diocese of Porto Nacional
 30 October 1980: Promoted as Diocese of Tocantinópolis
 31 January 2023: Lost territories to establish the Diocese of Araguaína

Bishops
 Prelates of Tocantinópolis (Roman Rite)
Cornélio Chizzini, F.D.P. † (12 April 1962 - 30 October 1980) became bishop of the diocese
 Bishops of Tocantinópolis (Roman rite)
Cornélio Chizzini, F.D.P.  (30 October 1980 - 12 August 1981) Died
Aloísio Hilário de Pinho, F.D.P. (9 November 1981 - 22 December 1999) Appointed, Bishop of Jataí
Miguel Ângelo Freitas Ribeiro (17 January 2001 - 31 October 2007) Appointed, Bishop of Oliveira
Giovane Pereira de Melo (4 March 2009 – present)

Other priest of this diocese who became bishop
Wellington de Queiroz Vieira, appointed Prelate of Cristalândia, Goias in 2017

References
 GCatholic.org
 Catholic Hierarchy
 Diocese website (Portuguese)

Roman Catholic dioceses in Brazil
Christian organizations established in 1954
Tocantinópolis, Roman Catholic Diocese of
Roman Catholic dioceses and prelatures established in the 20th century